This is a list of episodes for the animated series Ōban Star-Racers.

See also 
 Ōban Star-Racers

External links 
 TV Guide's Ōban Star-Racers Episode list
 
 TV.com's Ōban Star-Racers Episode Guide

Oban Star-Racers
Oban Star-Racers